Jalan Tun Dr Awang is a major highway in Penang, Malaysia. It was named after Tun Dr Awang Hassan, the former Yang di-Pertua Negeri (Governor) of Penang.

Route background
The Kilometre Zero is located at Bulatan Bayan Lepas roundabout in Bayan Lepas.

At most sections, it was built under the JKR R5 road standard, allowing maximum speed limit of up to 90 km/h.

List of interchanges

Highways in Malaysia
Malaysian Federal Roads
Expressways and highways in Penang
Roads in Penang